Oeiras e São Julião da Barra was a former civil parish in the municipality of Oeiras, Portugal. In 2013, the parish merged into the new parish Oeiras e São Julião da Barra, Paço de Arcos e Caxias.

References

Former parishes of Oeiras, Portugal
Seaside resorts in Portugal